Ian Scott Waltz (born April 15, 1977) is an American discus thrower.  He is originally from Post Falls, Idaho and attended Washington State University. Waltz competed at the 2004 Summer Olympics and the 2008 Summer Olympics. His personal best distance is 68.91 metres, achieved in May 2006 in Salinas, California.

He married Olympic Pole Vault Gold Medalist, Stacy Dragila on December 12, 2009.  Dragila welcomed daughter Allyx Josephine Waltz on June 21, 2010, in Chula Vista, California.

Achievements

References

External links 
 
 
 
 
 
 

1977 births
Living people
American male discus throwers
Athletes (track and field) at the 2004 Summer Olympics
Athletes (track and field) at the 2008 Summer Olympics
Olympic track and field athletes of the United States
Track and field athletes from Idaho
Washington State University alumni
People from Post Falls, Idaho